Dieter: Der Film ("Dieter: The Film") is a 2006 satirical animated film based on Nichts als die Wahrheit ("Nothing But the Truth"), the autobiography of German music producer Dieter Bohlen published in 2002. The entirety of the soundtrack, including the theme song "Gasoline", was written, composed, and produced by Bohlen. The film was broadcast for the first time on 4 March 2006 on RTL.

Plot 
Dieter was born on an East Frisian farm. Very early on, he develops a weakness for beautiful women and music. His father teaches him to always "put some money aside", as one never knows what one might need it for someday.

As a teenager, Dieter plays in several bands and, thanks to that, is very popular with the girls. When he grows up, he begins working as a producer for a record company. His colleague Andy teaches him the equation for success: "Haste Geld, haste Autos, haste Frauen" (English: "If you have money, you have cars, and you have women"). Dieter produces various artists without much success.

Someday, Dieter meets singer Thomas and founds the band Modern Talking, which soon achieves worldwide success. But Thomas's wife Nora interferes more and more with the band's affairs and Modern Talking split up as a result.

Dieter later gets to know Naddel, whom he falls in love with mostly because of her big but fake breasts, and they move together into a big house. However, Dieter then meets Verona and falls in love again. He breaks up with Naddel and marries Verona, but she seems to only be interested in his money. She divorces him and gets 300 trillion Deutsche Mark.

Just as Dieter falls into desperation, Modern Talking makes their comeback and their success is bigger than the first time. However, as he wants the success and most of all the money all to himself, he goes to hell. There, he is made to choose between three options to spend eternity: with Wolfgang Petry, as "Thomas Anders's guitarist", or in his studio. Relieved, he chooses his studio. However, once there, he meets Verona again.

Cast

Original voices

Background 
The film, which cost around 6.5 million euros, was already completed in 2004 and was supposed to be released in cinemas during the autumn of that year. Following the first postponement to 2005, the film launch was finally cancelled by the distributor Universum Film. In the media, rumours circulated about a lack of quality of the drawings and the story, but the official reason given was that the timing was no longer appropriate: Dieter: Der Film would "not work anymore" for cinemas because the hype around Bohlen and Deutschland sucht den Superstar, the programme supported by him, had gone flat in the meantime. The film premiered after one more year of waiting, in 2006.

The soundtrack was released to accompany the film premiere and Bohlen announced his next book Meine Hammer-Sprüche (English: My Best Quotes). The final of the third season of Deutschland sucht den Superstar was broadcast two weeks after the film. Dieter: Der Film was released on DVD on 12 April 2006.

Reception

Critical reception 
The film received mostly negative reviews from critics. Christian Buß of spiegel.de called the film "a long delayed, completely humour-free animated biopic" and expressed that he felt it "makes the advertised product appear in a rather dubious light". Kino.de compared it negatively to Derrick: Die Pflicht ruft (Derrick: Duty calls), an animated parody of series Derrick.

Viewing figures 
The official public premiere of the film took place on 4 March 2006 on RTL. Dieter: Der Film, which had been mainly advertised through cross promotion, had to compete with the popular programme Wetten, dass..?, which was running at the same time. However, contrarily to expert assessments, it reached 5.51 million viewers and thus a market share of 15,9%.

Soundtrack

A soundtrack to the movie was released on 3 March 2006 on Hansa Records. It features 12 new tracks by Dieter Bohlen, including a previously unreleased Modern Talking track "Shooting Star".

Track listing

References

External links 
 
 Stern.de: Bohlens Comic-Sex zu schlecht fürs Kino (English: Bohlen's comic sex too bad for cinemas) 

2006 films
2006 television films
2006 animated films
2000s musical comedy films
2000s biographical films
German animated films
German musical comedy films
German biographical films
German satirical films
2000s German-language films
German-language television shows
German television films
Biographical films about musicians
Cultural depictions of pop musicians
Cultural depictions of German men
Films about composers
Films based on biographies
Films set in the 1980s
Films set in the 1990s
Animation based on real people
Dieter Bohlen
Modern Talking
2006 comedy films
Films directed by Toby Genkel
2000s German films
RTL (German TV channel) original programming